This is a list of car-free islands: islands inhabited by humans which have legally restricted or eliminated vehicle traffic from their territories.

See also
 Carfree city
 Car-free movement
 Low Traffic Neighbourhood
 Pedestrian zone
 List of pedestrian zones

References

External links 

 Touropia, 10 Laid-back Islands without Cars, 17 December 2022

Transport lists
Car-related lists
Car-free places